Aurelius H. Piper Sr. (August 31, 1916 – August 3, 2008), also known as Big Eagle or Chief Big Eagle, was the hereditary chief of the Golden Hill Paugussett Indian Nation of Connecticut from 1959 until 2008.

Early life
Piper served in the United States military during World War II and took part in the American landings during the North African Campaign.

Hereditary chief
Piper was named hereditary chief of the Golden Hill Paugussett Indian Nation by his mother, Chieftess Rising Star, in 1959. Piper later took up residence in the Paugussett's quarter-acre reservation in Trumbull, Connecticut.

Piper traveled extensively as a representative of the Golden Hill Paugussett and other Native American groups to campaign for the rights of ethnic minorities and indigenous peoples. He visited Moscow as part of a delegation of Native Americans. Piper also wrote for the De Kiva Journal as an eastern North American Indian foreign correspondent. The De Kivas advocates for Native American rights before the International Human Rights Council in Geneva and is based in Belgium and the Netherlands.

Piper's son, Kenneth, who is also known as Moonface Bear, was involved on a ten-week standoff between Connecticut State Police and the Colchester, Connecticut, branch of the Golden Hill Paugussett. The standoff stemmed from the illegal sale of untaxed cigarettes on the Colchester portion of the reservation. Kenneth Piper died in 1996.

Piper served on the boards of several Connecticut organizations which advocated for Native American and minority rights. He also served as a "spiritual liaison" for Native Americans in prison. He was named chief of the century by the Florida chapter of the White Buffalo Society "for his work in furthering Native American causes in Connecticut, across the country, and abroad."

"It is a sacred obligation", says the Golden Hill Paugussett Chief, Big Eagle. "Indian people must keep their languages alive. If the language is not spoken, it must be made to live again."

Piper was the subject of the book Quarter Acre of Heartache which is attributed to Claude Clayton Smith but is primarily written by Piper. The book details the history of the Paugussett Indian Nation and the fight to save what was left of their tribal land- a quarter acre property in suburban Trumbull, Connecticut.

Death
Aurelius H. Piper Sr. died of natural causes on August 3, 2008, at the Golden Hill reservation in Trumbull, Connecticut, at the age of 92. He was survived by his wife, Marsha Conte Piper; five children; several stepchildren, grandchildren, and great-grandchildren.

A spokesman for the Golden Hill Paugussett confirmed that Piper's son, Aurelius H. Piper Jr., who is also known as Chief Quiet Hawk, will assume the title of hereditary chief from his father.

Background
Golden Hill Paugussett Indian Nation is a small tribe with tiny Connecticut reservations in both Trumbull and Colchester. It has been an officially recognized tribe by the state of Connecticut for approximately 300 years. However, the United States Bureau of Indian Affairs has repeatedly refused the tribe's request for federal recognition. The last refusal came in 2004. The tribe's land claim included an area stretching from Middletown to Wilton and from Greenwich, Connecticut, through lower portions of New York's Westchester County, which set off legal challenges against the tribe's recognition attempts. The Golden Hill Paugussett has dropped these far reaching land claims, but could revive them if federal recognition is eventually achieved.

References

External links
Novak, Viveca & Thompson, Mark (March 6, 2000). "The Lost Tribe?". Time. 155 (9).

1916 births
2008 deaths
Native American activists
People from Trumbull, Connecticut
Native American United States military personnel
American military personnel of World War II
Native American people from Connecticut